Soibugh is a town in Budgam district in the Indian-administered union territory of Jammu and Kashmir. It is one of the highly populated area of district Budgam. Soibugh is one of the 17 blocks of Budgam district.

Geography

Demography 
, the population of Soibugh is 9,873 of which 5,066 are males while the remaining 4,807 are females as per the report released by census of India. Population of the children with age 0-6 is 1,539. Total number of households in this village is 1,471. The location code of Soibugh is 000624. The number of literates are 4,095 in which 2,391 are males and 1,704 are females.

See also 
 Ichgam
 Budgam

References 

Villages in Budgam district